Studenec may refer to:

Czech Republic
 Studenec (Semily District), a municipality and village in the Liberec Region
 Studenec (Třebíč District), a municipality and village in the Vysočina Region

Slovakia
 Studenec (Levoča District), a municipality and village in the Prešov Region

Slovenia
 Studenec, Postojna, a village in the Inner Carniola region
 Studenec na Blokah, a village in the Inner Carniola region
 Studenec pri Krtini, a settlement in the Upper Carniola region
 Studenec (Ljubljana), a formerly independent settlement in the City Municipality of Ljubljana
 Studenec, Sevnica, a settlement in the municipality of Sevnica